The Boynton Bicycle Railroad was a monorail in Brooklyn on Long Island, New York. It ran on a single load-bearing rail at ground level, but with a wooden overhead stabilising rail engaged by a pair of horizontally opposed wheels. The railway operated for only two years, but the design was adopted elsewhere.

History 

The concept was invented by Eben Moody Boynton, who hoped that this would eventually replace the conventional rail road, because it was cheaper to build and could be used for a double track on the space available for a conventional single track right of way.

According to the Scientific American of 28 March 1891, the steam locomotive and cars were in regular and continuous operation for passenger service during several weeks in the summer of 1890. The service was provided between the Gravesend and Coney Island areas of Brooklyn, on an abandoned section of an old standard-gauge railway track of the Sea Beach and Brighton Railroad. The first locomotive weighed nine tons, and had two  cylinders, the piston rods of both being connected with cranks on each side the single 6 foot driving wheel, and the front of the locomotive being also supported by two  pony wheels, one behind the other. These wheels had double flanges, to contact with either side of the track rail, as also had similarly arranged pairs of 38 inch wheels arranged under and housed in the floors near each end of the passenger cars.”

A heavier locomotive was especially designed for this method of traction, and built for use on a street railway. It weighed 16 tons and had a pair of  drivers.

In a true line with, and fifteen feet directly above, the face of the track rail was the lower face of a guide rail, supported from posts arranged along the side of the track, and on the sides of this guide rail run pairs of rubber-faced trolley wheels attached to the top of the locomotive and the cars. The guide rail was a simple stringer of yellow pine, 4¼ by 8 inches in section, and the standards on which the wheels are journaled were placed far enough apart to allow a space of 6 inches between the continuous faces of each pair of wheels, thus affording 1¾ inches for lateral play, or sidewise movement toward or from the guard rail, it being designed that the guide rail shall be arranged in the exact line of the true center of gravity of the cars and locomotive. The standards were bolted to six-inch wide strap iron attached to and extending across the top of the car.

The switching arrangement was remarkably simple. In addition to an ordinary track switch, in which, however, the switch bar is made to throw only one rail, a connection was made by means of a vertical rod and upper switch bar with a shifting section of the guide rail, whereby, on the moving of the track rail and the setting of the signal, the guide rail was simultaneously moved, the adjustment being effected and both being locked in position according to the methods usual in ordinary railway practice.

The passenger cars were each two stories in height, each story being divided lengthwise into nine separate compartments, each of which seated comfortably four passengers, thus providing seats for 72 passengers in each car. Each compartment had its own sliding door, and all the doors on the same floor of the car were connected by rods at the top and bottom with a lever in convenient reach of the brakeman, by whom the doors are all opened and closed simultaneously. The compartments were each four feet wide and five feet long, the seats facing each other. Only one rail of the old single track was used, as only one guide rail had been erected, except at the ends of the route, for switching purposes, but the width of the cars and motor was such that it only required the erection of another guide rail, for the utilizing of the other track rail, to form a regular double-track road of the Boynton pattern.

During a portion of the season, when the summer travel to Coney Island was at its height, trains were run on regular schedule time, 50 three-car-trains daily each way, carrying up to 300 passengers per trip.

Locomotive designs
At least four different locomotive designs for the Boynton Bicycle Railroad were produced but it is unclear how many were actually built.  

The freight locomotive resembles a Double Fairlie.

See also 
 Pelham Park and City Island Railway
 Lartigue Monorail
 Wuppertal Schwebebahn

References

External links 

 Robert Koplowicz: The Boynton Bicycle Railway

Monorails in the United States
Long Island
History of rail transport
New York (state) railroads